Jim Courier and Patrick Rafter were the defending champions but did not compete that year.

Todd Woodbridge and Mark Woodforde won in the final 7–5, 7–6 against Jonas Björkman and Tommy Ho.

Seeds

  Todd Woodbridge /  Mark Woodforde (champions)
  Cyril Suk /  Daniel Vacek (quarterfinals)
  Byron Black /  Grant Connell (semifinals)
  Jonas Björkman /  Tommy Ho (final)

Draw

References
 1996 Australian Men's Hardcourt Championships Doubles Draw

Next Generation Adelaide International
1996 ATP Tour
1996 in Australian tennis